Weaver Place (a.k.a. Errolton) is a historic house in Columbus, Lowndes County, Mississippi, United States.

Location
It is located at 216 3rd Avenue South in Columbus, Mississippi.

Overview
The house was built in the 1840s. It was the private residence of Frederick Tolbert Weaver (1823-1902) and his wife, Susan Elizabeth (Smith) Weaver (1830-1906).

It has been listed on the National Register of Historic Places since November 16, 1978.

References

Houses on the National Register of Historic Places in Mississippi
Houses in Lowndes County, Mississippi
National Register of Historic Places in Lowndes County, Mississippi